This is a list of weapons of the Corpo Truppe Volontarie  which was an Italian ground force that supported the Nationalists during the Spanish Civil War. It was composed  of regular Royal Italian Army soldiers and members of the Blackshirt Paramilitary organisation.

Small arms

Rifles 
 Carcano

Sidearms 
 Beretta M1934
 Bodeo Model 1889

Machine guns 
 Breda 30
 Fiat–Revelli Modello 1914

Submachine guns 
 Beretta M1918

Mortars 
 81/14 Model 35 Mortar-for reference 8 look at  the list you can download on the page

Artillery

Field guns 

 Cannone da 75/27 modello 11

Mountain guns 

 Cannone da 65/17 modello 13-Most common artillery piece

Armoured fighting vehicles

Tankettes 

 L3/33
 L3/35

References

Second Spanish Republic